Adobe Falls is a seasonal waterfall on a tributary of the San Diego River. San Diego State University owns the land and it is currently posted with No Trespassing signs. There is no legal public access to this location. Due to high trespass traffic and destruction of the natural environment fences have been put in place and it is being regularly patrolled. Remedies are being explored for removing the graffiti in a manner that will not pollute the environment and to remove the trash that has accumulated there. 

The San Diego Historical Resources Board declared the falls a historic landmark in 1973 (San Diego Historic Landmark #80).

See also
 List of San Diego Historic Landmarks

References

Waterfalls of California
Landforms of San Diego County, California
San Diego River
Landmarks in San Diego